Wonka is an upcoming musical fantasy film directed by Paul King from a screenplay written by Simon Farnaby and King. The film serves as a prequel to the 1964 novel Charlie and the Chocolate Factory by Roald Dahl and stars Timothée Chalamet as the titular character, following his early days as an eccentric chocolatier. Keegan-Michael Key, Rowan Atkinson, Sally Hawkins, Olivia Colman, and Jim Carter star in supporting roles.

Wonka is scheduled to be released on December 15, 2023, by Warner Bros. Pictures.

Premise 
The story follows a young Willy Wonka and his adventures prior to opening the world's most famous chocolate factory.

Cast 
 Timothée Chalamet as Willy Wonka
 Keegan-Michael Key
 Rowan Atkinson
 Sally Hawkins
 Olivia Colman
 Jim Carter
 Matt Lucas
 Natasha Rothwell
 Tom Davis
 Mathew Baynton
 Simon Farnaby
 Rich Fulcher
 Kobna Holdbrook-Smith
 Paterson Joseph as Arthur Slugworth
 Calah Lane
 Colin O'Brien
 Rakhee Thakrar
 Ellie White
 Murray McArthur
 Tracy Ifeachor

Production 

In October 2016, Warner Bros. Pictures acquired the rights to the Willy Wonka character by Roald Dahl, with a film in development from producers David Heyman and Michael Siegel. In February 2018, it was announced Paul King was in negotiations to direct. That same year, it was reported the studio's shortlist of actors to star as Willy Wonka included Donald Glover, Ryan Gosling, and Ezra Miller, and it was revealed the film would, in fact, serve as a prequel to the 1964 novel Charlie and the Chocolate Factory.

In January 2021, it was confirmed King would direct the film, now titled Wonka. In May, Timothée Chalamet was cast in the title role and it was announced the film would include several musical numbers. It was also revealed the film would be using a screenplay co-written by his Paddington 2 (2017) collaborator Simon Farnaby; Jeff Nathanson, Simon Rich, and Simon Stephenson also provided additional literary material. Tom Holland had also been a frontrunner for the role before Chalamet was cast. In September 2021, it was announced Keegan-Michael Key, Sally Hawkins, Rowan Atkinson, Olivia Colman and Jim Carter were among the newest additions to the cast, with Farnaby also set for a role.

Principal photography began in the United Kingdom in September 2021, with Seamus McGarvey set as cinematographer, Nathan Crowley as production designer, Mark Everson as film editor, and Lindy Hemming as costume designer. Filming took place in Lyme Regis and Bath, as well as at Warner Bros. Studios, Leavesden in Watford. Filming also occurred at the Rivoli Ballroom in Brockley, London. In December, McGarvey exited as cinematographer with Chung Chung-hoon replacing him. Scenes were shot in Oxford in December and February.

Music 
Neil Hannon, lead singer of the band The Divine Comedy, contributes original songs for the film.

Marketing 

The marketing campaign from Warner Bros. Pictures for Wonka began on October 10, 2021 when Chalamet shared a photograph of himself in costume as Willy Wonka. The image was posted on Chalamet's Instagram with the caption "The suspense is terrible, I hope it will last," a reference to the 1971 film Willy Wonka & the Chocolate Factory starring Gene Wilder as the title character. The Guardian noted that the image was met with mixed reception online.

Release 
The film is scheduled to be theatrically released by Warner Bros. Pictures on December 15, 2023. It was originally set for March 17, 2023.

References

External links 
 

2023 fantasy films
2020s musical films
American musical fantasy films
British musical fantasy films
Films about chocolate
Films based on British novels
Films based on children's books
Films based on works by Roald Dahl
Films directed by Paul King (director)
Films produced by David Heyman
Films shot at Warner Bros. Studios, Leavesden
Films shot in Dorset
Films shot in London
Films shot in Oxfordshire
Films shot in Somerset
Heyday Films films
Upcoming English-language films
Upcoming prequel films
Warner Bros. films
Willy Wonka
2020s English-language films
2020s American films
2020s British films
American prequel films
British prequel films